Dameon Pierce (born February 19, 2000) is an American football running back for the Houston Texans of the National Football League (NFL). He played college football at Florida and was drafted by the Texans in the fourth round of the 2022 NFL Draft.

Early life
Pierce grew up in Bainbridge, Georgia and attended Bainbridge High School. As a senior, he rushed for 2,123 yards and 32 touchdowns. Pierce finished his high school career with 6,779 rushing yards and 92 total touchdowns scored. He was rated a four-star recruit and committed to play college football at Florida over offers from Alabama, Florida State, Miami (Florida), Georgia, South Carolina, and Auburn.

College career
Pierce rushed for 424 yards and two touchdowns on 69 carries in his freshman season. As a sophomore, he rushed 305 yards and four touchdowns. Pierce also played on special teams during his first two seasons. As a junior, he led the Gators with 503 rushing yards and four touchdowns and caught 17 passes for 156 yards and one touchdown. Pierce gained 574 yards and scored 13 touchdowns on 100 carries and also caught 19 passes for 216 yards and three touchdowns in his senior season.

Professional career
Pierce was selected by the Houston Texans with the 107th overall pick in the fourth round of the 2022 NFL Draft.

Pierce made his NFL debut in Week 1 against the Indianapolis Colts. He had 11 carries for 33 rushing yards in the 20–20 tie. In Week 3, against the Chicago Bears, he scored his first professional touchdown on a one-yard rush. The following week, against the Los Angeles Chargers, Pierce broke out with 14 carries for 131 yards and one touchdown, which was a 75-yard rush. In Week 9, against the Philadelphia Eagles, he had 27 carries for 139 rushing yards in the 29–17 loss. His season was cut short by an ankle injury in the fourth quarter of week 13 against the Dallas Cowboys. He finished his season with 939 rushing yards and four touchdowns, along with 30 catches for 165 yards and one touchdown through 13 games and starts.

References

External links
 
 Houston Texans bio
 Florida Gators bio

2000 births
Living people
American football running backs
Florida Gators football players
Players of American football from Georgia (U.S. state)
People from Bainbridge, Georgia
Houston Texans players